Jacob Adaktusson (born 31 August 1980) is a professional tennis player from Sweden.

Tennis career
The greatest achievement of Adaktusson's career is qualifying for the main draw of the 2006 Australian Open. He played veteran Davide Sanguinetti in the first round and lost in straight sets.

Adaktusson plays mainly on the Challenger circuit, where he has been a runner-up four times, twice in singles and two more times in the doubles. It is as a doubles player that he has competed in his two ATP Tour tournaments, with Joachim Johansson at Stockholm in 2000 and partnering Johan Landsberg at the 2007 Swedish Open. He and his partner exited in the opening round of both events.

He made a comeback on the tour in September 2012 after several years out of the game and is as of January 2013 playing on the ITF Men's Circuit.

ITF Futures titles

Singles: 6

Doubles: 4

References

External links

1980 births
Living people
Swedish male tennis players
Tennis players from Stockholm
20th-century Swedish people
21st-century Swedish people